Occupational welfare is welfare distributed by industry as part of employment. First characterized by British social researcher and teacher Richard Titmuss in 1956, occupational welfare includes perks, salary-related benefits, measures intended to improve the efficiency of the workforce and some philanthropic measures.

See also
 Corporate welfare
 Social Policy
 Fiscal Welfare
 Social Welfare

References

External links
 Equality and Welfare
 

Business terms
Welfare economics